Warhunt is a 2022 American horror film directed by Mauro Borrelli and starring Mickey Rourke.

During World War II, a U.S. military cargo plane crashes behind enemy lines in Germany's Black Forest. Maj. Johnson soon sends a squad of his bravest soldiers to retrieve the top-secret material from the wreckage. Venturing deep into the forest, the team discovers hanged Nazis and other bodies bearing ancient, magical symbols. Attacked by a powerful, supernatural force, the men soon find themselves in a fight for their lives as they try to uncover the shocking truth behind the unspeakable evil.

Cast
Mickey Rourke
Robert Knepper
Jackson Rathbone
Polina Pushkareva

Production
The film was shot in Riga.

Filming wrapped in April 2020.

Release
The film was released in theaters, on digital and on demand on January 21, 2022.

Reception
The film has a 27 percent rating on Rotten Tomatoes based on eleven reviews.

Joe Leydon of Variety gave the film a positive review and wrote, "Blood-drained Nazis! Predatory witches! Mind-twisted soldiers! And Mickey Rourke in an eyepatch! Cowabunga!"

Michael Pementel of Bloody Disgusting also gave it a positive review, giving it four "skulls" out of five.

References

External links
 

2022 films
American horror films
Films shot in Latvia
2020s English-language films
Films directed by Mauro Borrelli
2020s American films
English-language horror films